Hit FM Top 100 Singles of the Year is the music industry record chart that ranks the most popular songs in Taiwan, published yearly by Hit FM since 1998. Chart rankings are based on online poll in Taiwan.

The first number-one song on this chart was "Look Over Here, Girl" by Richie Jen in 1998. With five songs topping this chart, Jolin Tsai has the most number-one songs on this chart.

Number-one singles

See also 
 List of best-selling albums in Taiwan

References

External links 
 

Record charts